Giuliana P. Davidoff is an American mathematician specializing in number theory and expander graphs. She is the Robert L. Rooke Professor of Mathematics and the chair of mathematics and statistics at Mount Holyoke College.

Education and career
Davidoff is a graduate of Rollins College. She completed her Ph.D. in 1984 at New York University, with Peter Sarnak as her doctoral advisor; her dissertation was Statistical Properties of Certain Exponential Sums.

Books
Davidoff is a coauthor of:
Elementary Number Theory, Group Theory and Ramanujan Graphs (with Peter Sarnak and Alain Valette, 2003)
The Geometry of Numbers (with Carl D. Olds and Anneli Cahn Lax, 2001)
Laboratories in Mathematical Experimentation: A Bridge to Higher Mathematics (1997)

References

External links
Home page

Year of birth missing (living people)
Living people
20th-century American mathematicians
21st-century American mathematicians
American women mathematicians
Number theorists
Graph theorists
Rollins College alumni
New York University alumni
Mount Holyoke College faculty
20th-century American women
21st-century American women